Guy Le Querrec (born 1941 in Paris, France) is a French photographer and filmmaker, noted for his documentary images of jazz musicians. He is a member of Magnum Photos.

Career

Le Querrec took his first photographs as a teenager using a basic Fex/Indo Ultra-Fex, buying second hand soon after another and more sophisticated bakelite 6 x 9 cm Photax viewfinder camera, in 1955. He shot his first pictures of jazz musicians in London in the late 1950s. After having served in the army, he became a professional in 1967, and then worked as a picture editor and photographer for Jeune Afrique magazine, working in francophone Africa, including Chad, Cameroon, Niger, and Central African Republic. In 1971 he gave his archives to Agence Vu, founded by Pierre de Fenoyl and then co-founded Viva (photo agency), with Martine Franck, Hervé Gloaguen, and others. In 1976, he joined Magnum Photos.

In the late 1970s he began directing films, working with Robert Bober. In 1983 at the Rencontres d'Arles he experimented with projecting images while a jazz quartet played.

Besides having photographed numerous jazz festivals and African subjects, Le Querrec has traveled to China and documented American Indians. He has documented Villejuif, a suburb of Paris, as well as the Carnation Revolution in Portugal. He has also taught many photography workshops in France.

Filmography
Un repas de famille, 1979, Institut national de l'audiovisuel, Paris, France
Les nouveaux créateurs (The New Creators), 1978, TF1, France
La batterie... vous rappelez pas? 1979, Institut national de l'audiovisuel
L'oeil au papier de perre, 1979, FR3, France
Chasse à l’homme, 1981, TF1, France
Le voyage de Rose, 1982
L’ennemi intérieur, 1983, FR3, France
Une minute pour une image (One Minute for One Image), 1983
Jazz Impressions, 1984
La Republique nous appelle, 1984, FR3, France

Bibliography
Quelque Part, Paris, France: Contrejour, 1977, 
Portugal 1974-1975 : Regards sur une tentative de pouvoir populaire, France: Hier & Demain, 1979
Jazz sous les platanes, Vitrolles, France: Editions Java, 1984
Tête à tête : Daniel Druet, un Sculpteur et ses modèles, France: Carrère, 1988
Musicales, Amiens, France: Trois Cailloux, 1991
Jazz comme une image, Banlieues Bleues, Paris, France: Scandéditions, 1993
Carnet de Routes, Paris, France: Label bleu, 1995
Jazz de J à ZZ, Paris, France: Marval, 1996, ASIN B004DKQZS4
François Mitterrand : des temps de pose à l'Elysée, Paris, France: Marval, 1997, 
Suites Africaines, Carnet de Routes, France: Label bleu, 1999
Jazz Light and Day, Italy: Federico Motta Editore, 2001
On the Trail to Wounded Knee: The Big Foot Memorial Ride, USA: Lyons Press, 2002, 
African Flashback, France: Label bleu, 2005

Recent Exhibitions
Big Foot Trail, 2002, Gallery Hermès, New York City, USA
JAZZ de J à ZZ, 2002, Centro de la Imagen, Braga, Portugal
Rencontres internationales de d’jazz, 2003, Nevers, France
JAZZ de J à ZZ, 2003, L’Espal, Le Mans, France
L'oeil de l'elephant, 2006, Rencontres d'Arles, France

Awards
Grand Prix de la Ville de Paris, 1998

References

External links
Photographs by Guy Le Querrec at Magnum Photos
Biography of Guy Le Querrec at Magnum Photos

1941 births
Living people
Magnum photographers
Jazz photographers
French photojournalists
Street photographers